Óscar Salazar Blanco (born November 3, 1977, in Mexico City) is a Mexican taekwondo practitioner and Olympic medalist. He competed at the 2004 Summer Olympics in Athens, where he received a silver medal in the 58 kg class. He won a gold medal at the 1999 Pan American Games in Winnipeg.

Career Achievements
1996 Pan American Taekwondo Championships Fly - Gold
1997 World Taekwondo Championships Fly - Bronze
1998 Pan American Taekwondo Championships Fly - Gold
1999 Pan American Games Fly - Gold
2000 World Taekwondo Cup Fly - Silver
2002 Pan American Taekwondo Championships bantham - Gold
2002 Centro American Games Bantham - Gold 
2003 Pan American Games Fly - Silver
2004 Pan American Olympic Qualify Tourney Fly - Gold

References

External links
 

1977 births
Living people
Mexican male taekwondo practitioners
Taekwondo practitioners at the 2004 Summer Olympics
Taekwondo practitioners at the 2007 Pan American Games
Olympic silver medalists for Mexico
Olympic taekwondo practitioners of Mexico
Olympic medalists in taekwondo
Medalists at the 2004 Summer Olympics
Pan American Games gold medalists for Mexico
Pan American Games silver medalists for Mexico
Pan American Games medalists in taekwondo
World Taekwondo Championships medalists
Taekwondo practitioners at the 1999 Pan American Games
Medalists at the 1999 Pan American Games
Medalists at the 2003 Pan American Games
Sportspeople from Mexico City